Friot is a surname. Notable people with the surname include:
 Bernard Friot (born 1946), French sociologist and economist
 Stephen P. Friot (born 1947), United States judge